David Osbaldeston (born 1968) is a British visual artist and academic based in the UK. He is currently Reader in Fine Art at the Manchester School of Art. His work involves the reorganization of materials, objects, and language to create absurdist systems. He currently lives and works in Manchester & Scotland.

Education
He completed his studies at the Rijksakademie Amsterdam and previously attended both Sheffield Hallam University and Manchester Metropolitan University.

Collections
 Tate Museum
 British Council Collection
 Whitworth Art Gallery
 Bury Art Gallery

References

External links
Manchester School of Art faculty profile

Living people
1968 births
20th-century British artists
21st-century British artists